Peter Kuckei (born May 25, 1938 in Husum, Germany) is a German painter and stained glass artist.

Biography
From 1960 to 1961 Peter Kuckei studied at the Staatliche Akademie der Bildenden Künste in Bremen, as well as from 1961 to 1963 at the Staatliche Akademie der Bildenden Künste in Stuttgart with Prof. H. Wildemann.
Peter Kuckei lectured from 1986 to 1987 at the Staatliche Akamdemie der Bildenden Künste in Stuttgart, Germany. He lives and works in Berlin and Butjadingen since 1963. In 1993 he opened his studio in the United States in San Francisco, California. After ten years he established in 2002 in Miami, Florida, where he currently lives and works.

Exhibitions
 1965: Galerie Strecker, Berlin, Germany
 1966: Galerie Elmshorn, Zürich, Switzerland
 1975: Galerie der Girokasse Stuttgart, Germany (with K.-H. Kliemann)
 1981: Galerie der Landesgirokasse Stuttgart (with Heinrich Wildemann)
 1984: Raum 41, Bonn, Germany
 1985: Bremer Kunstpreis, Kunsthalle Bremen
 1989: Galerie Nieuwe Weg, Doorn, Netherlands
 1990: ART London, Galerie Nieuwe Weg, Doorn, Netherlands
 1992: Städtischer Kunstverein Paderborn, Germany
 1996: Associated Arts, Amsterdam, Netherlands
 2006: Gallery Reedsavage, Miami, USA

Collections
His work is included in the collection of the Fine Arts Museums of San Francisco.

References

External links 
 Official web site
 

Living people
1938 births
German artists